"Thank You for Being a Friend" is a song written by Andrew Gold. It was recorded for Gold's third album, All This and Heaven Too. The song reached number 25 on the Billboard Hot 100 chart in 1978. On the Cash Box chart, "Thank You for Being a Friend" spent two weeks at number 11. A cover by Cynthia Fee was the theme song for the NBC sitcom The Golden Girls.

Overview
According to Gold, "Thank You for Being a Friend" was "just this little throwaway thing" that took him "about an hour to write".

Personnel 
 Andrew Gold – lead vocals, backing vocals, acoustic piano, synthesizers, percussion
 Waddy Wachtel – guitars
 Kenny Edwards – bass, backing vocals
 Jeff Porcaro – drums
 Brock Walsh – backing vocals

Other versions
The song was later re-recorded by Cynthia Fee to serve as the theme song for the NBC sitcom The Golden Girls, and recorded again for the series' CBS spin-off The Golden Palace.

Additionally, the song was featured as a dedication to the host on Casey Kasem's final American Top 20/10, broadcast on the Fourth of July weekend in 2009; at the end of two World Series games (Game 5 in 1988 and Game 4 in 1990); in the It's Always Sunny in Philadelphia episode "Mac's Mom Burns Her House Down"; at the end of Super Bowl XL; in the episode of The Simpsons titled "Double, Double, Boy in Trouble"; on episodes of the TV shows Dancing with the Stars, Family Guy, New Girl, Looking, Unbreakable Kimmy Schmidt, The Goldbergs, Arrested Development, Atlanta, and the TV special Trolls Holiday, as well as on a May 2010 episode of Saturday Night Live hosted by Golden Girls star Betty White, in which past and present cast members sang the song followed by a death metal version of the song performed by White herself while wearing a ski mask. Elaine Paige and Dionne Warwick released a recording of the song on Paige's duet album Elaine Paige and Friends in 2010. Other notables who covered the song include ex-Beatle Ringo Starr whose unreleased recording of the composition was produced by longtime Andrew Gold confederate Peter Asher, and actress/chanteuse Bernadette Peters who used it to open her 1979 live video release Bernadette Peters In Concert.

The song was included in the Wearside Jack tape by someone purporting to be the Yorkshire Ripper; covered by ska-pop band Suburban Legends on their 2015 album Forever in the FriendZone, and re-imagined by Virginia punk-rockers The Blanche Devereauxs on their 2009 LP Midnight Cheesecake Banter. It was also recorded by singer-songwriter and sometime Gold collaborator Stephen Bishop; ensembles such as the Starlite Singers, Wild Stylerz, Smooch, Bliss, The Blue Rubatos, and Micah's Rule; singers Alyssa Bonagura, Angela Galuppo, Valerie DeLaCruz, and Brynn Marie; and bandleader Brandon Schott, with instrumental interpretations by groups including the London Studio Orchestra, Orlando Pops Orchestra, the Twilight Trio, and the Instrumental All Stars with Dominic Kirwan.

Various iterations of the composition have also been used in a number of advertisements, including a commercial for the New York Lottery, a German ad for Toyota, a U.K. ad for KFC, a special one-off ad for Arby's to commemorate the end of Jon Stewart's run as host of TV's The Daily Show, a web ad for the Radio City Music Hall dance troupe the Rockettes, 2019 Campbells Soup Commercial, a 2013 Super Bowl ad for the National Football League, and in a trailer for the movie Deadpool 2, posted on lead actor Ryan Reynolds's Twitter account to thank fans for the box-office success of the superhero blockbuster.

The chorus of the song is sampled in Rachel Platten's song of the same name on the 2017 soundtrack album of My Little Pony: The Movie. In 2020, a version of the song was sung by Jane and Kat in The Bold Type, Season 4, Episode 16 "Not Far from the Tree".

Chart performance

Weekly charts

Year-end charts

References

External links
Single release info from discogs.com
 

1978 songs
Andrew Gold songs
Asylum Records singles
Songs about friendship
Songs written by Andrew Gold
Comedy television theme songs
1978 singles
The Golden Girls